Henvålen Nature Reserve is a nature reserve in Jämtland County in Sweden. It is part of the EU-wide Natura 2000-network and parts of the wetland areas are designated Ramsar sites.

The nature reserve occupies a plateau at the edge of the Scandinavian Mountains and includes, apart from mountainous areas also wetlands and old-growth forest. The highest part of the nature reserve is the mountain peak Särvfjället, reaching .

References

Nature reserves in Sweden
Natura 2000 in Sweden
Tourist attractions in Jämtland County
Geography of Jämtland County
Protected areas established in 1998
1998 establishments in Sweden
Ramsar sites in Sweden